A Perfect Fit may refer to:
 A Perfect Fit (2005 film)
 A Perfect Fit (2021 film)
 A Perfect Fit, a song by Oh Land, from the soundtrack Askepot